Donna M. Wolk is an American microbiologist who is Director of Clinical Microbiology at the Geisinger Health System. In 2017, she was honored by the American Society for Microbiology for her efforts to improve patient care using microbiology.

Early life and education 
Wolk grew up in a small town in rural Pennsylvania. She was the first in her family to attend college. She joined Pennsylvania State University as an undergraduate student, where she studied microbiology and clinical laboratory science. After graduating, Wolk trained as a medical technologist in Danville, Pennsylvania. She joined the Geisinger Medical Center, where she was eventually made Head of Clinical Microbiology.

Research and career 
Whilst Wolk enjoyed her career at the Geisinger Health System, she discovered that she was being paid considerably less than her male colleagues. She was told this wage disparity would only be rectified if she returned to college and completed a postgraduate degree, so she joined Wilkes University. Wolk returned to Geisinger, where she led the clinical microbiology laboratory for fourteen years.

Wolk returned to university in the mid-nineties to work toward a doctorate at the University of Arizona. She studied medical parasitology, demonstrating that chlorine could be used as an effective water treatment of Encephalitozoon syn. Septata intestinalis. She also demonstrated that spectrophotometric methods could be used for laboratory-based disinfection studies. After earning her doctorate, Wolk moved to the Mayo Clinic, where she completed a fellowship in clinical microbiology. During her fellowship, she developed a polymerase chain reaction (PCR) assay that could detect Encephalitozoon intestinalis in stool samples. Her rapid testing systems were translated out of the research lab, and used for the diagnostics of bacteria in emergency departments.

After completing her fellowship, Wolk returned to Arizona, where she was made Director of the Southern Arizona VA Health Care System. There she expanded the programs in clinical microbiology, and established the Infectious Diseases Research Core (IDRC), a Clinical Laboratory Improvement Amendments (CLIA) compliant research laboratory to test novel infectious diseases. In 2013, Wolk was offered the position of Director of Clinical Microbiology in the Geisinger Health System, where she was honored by the American Society for Microbiology for her efforts to improve patient care and medical outcomes using microbiology.

Wolk demonstrated that mass spectrometry could be used to differentiate biomarkers of anti-microbial resistance as well as in the diagnosis of bacteria and yeasts.

Selected publications

References 

Living people
Year of birth missing (living people)
American microbiologists
Women microbiologists
Scientists from Pennsylvania
Pennsylvania State University alumni
University of Arizona alumni
Wilkes University alumni